Novak Djokovic defeated Richard Gasquet 7–6(9–7), 0–6, 6–1 to win the 2007 Estoril Open singles event.

Seeds

Draw

Finals

Top half

Bottom half

External links
Singles draw
Singles qualifying draw

Men's singles